Evar Saar (born 16 August 1969) is an Estonian linguist, journalist, toponymist a Võro language activist. He has traveled extensively around the historical county of Võrumaa and documented the original names of all major geographical features there.  In total, he has collected over 50,000 names from the Võro language spoken in Southern Estonia.

Works
Võrumaa kohanimede analüüs enamlevinud nimeosade põhjal ja traditsioonilise kogukonna nimesüsteem. Dissertationes philologiae estonicae Universitatis Tartuensis, 1406–1325; 22, Tartu Ülikool 2008.
Räpina ja Vastseliina kohanimed. Sünkrooniline ülevaade ja andmebaas. In: Mariko Faster ja Evar Saar. Võromaa kotussõnimmist, Võro Instituut 2002. (MA thesis: Local names of Räpina and Vastseliina. Synchronical overview and database)
Eve Alender, Kairit Henno, Annika Hussar, Peeter Päll ja Evar Saar. Nimekorralduse analüüs, Eesti Keele Sihtasutus 2003. (Analysis of name planning)

References

1969 births
Living people
Linguists from Estonia
Estonian journalists
Toponymists
People from Võru County
Recipients of the Order of the White Star, 5th Class